Liberty Forge Arboretum (more than 100 acres) is an arboretum on the grounds of a commercial golf course, located at 3804 Lisburn Road, Mechanicsburg, Pennsylvania.

In 1798 the site was called the Liberty Forge Plantation, an iron forge and farm. It was subdivided during the 20th century, and the last farming ended in about 1985 when its land was purchased for a private residence, garden, and arboretum. Most of the surrounding site has been subsequently repurchased and reassembled, and became a for-profit recreation center in the early 1990s.

The site is currently owned by John Williams and operates as part of the Liberty Forge Golf Course as of 2003.

See also 
 List of botanical gardens in the United States

External links 
 Liberty Forge Arboretum

Arboreta in Pennsylvania
Botanical gardens in Pennsylvania
Parks in Cumberland County, Pennsylvania